Danforth may refer to:

 Danforth (surname)

Places

Canada
 Danforth Avenue, a thoroughfare in Toronto, Ontario
 Toronto—Danforth, an electoral district
 Toronto—Danforth (provincial electoral district), a provincial electoral district in Ontario
 Danforth (electoral district), an abolished electoral district in Ontario
 Greektown, Toronto, or The Danforth, a Toronto neighbourhood

United States
 Danforth, Illinois, a village
 Danforth, Maine, a town
 Danforth (CDP), Maine, the main village in the town
 Danforth, Missouri, an unincorporated community

Other uses
 Danforth (anchor), a fluke-style anchor
 Danforth Avenue (HBLR station), a light rail station in Hudson County, New Jersey
 Danforth Collegiate and Technical Institute, a technical school in Toronto, Canada
 Danforth Museum, an art museum and school in Framingham, Massachusetts
 Danforth, a fictional character in the Cthulhu Mythos

See also
 2018 Toronto shooting, also known as the Danforth Shooting
 Bloor–Danforth line, a subway line in Toronto
 Danforth's Road, Asa Danforth Jr.'s early colonial road from eastern Toronto to the Trent River
 Danforth GO Station, a Toronto station on the GO Transit commuter rail system
 Donald Danforth Plant Science Center, a not-for-profit research institute based in St. Louis, Missouri
 Toronto—Danforth, a federal and provincial electoral district